Chadshunt is a small village and civil parish in the Stratford-on-Avon district, in the county of Warwickshire, England. Chadshunt is located in between the villages of Gaydon (where population can be found), and Kineton. It grew up around the mill stream alongside Watery Lane. The former Yarlington Mill is now a private residence. Chadshunt has a church called All Saints Church.

References

External links 
 British History online
 Listed buildings in Chadshunt
 https://web.archive.org/web/20110719163742/http://www.warksbells.co.uk/chadshunt.htm

Villages in Warwickshire
Civil parishes in Warwickshire
Stratford-on-Avon District